Regulator of G-protein signaling 18 is a protein that in humans is encoded by the RGS18 gene.

Function 

This gene encodes a member of the regulator of G-protein signaling family. This protein contains a conserved 120 amino acid motif called the RGS domain. The protein attenuates the signaling activity of G-proteins by binding to activated, GTP-bound G alpha subunits and acting as a GTPase activating protein (GAP), increasing the rate of conversion of the GTP to GDP. This hydrolysis allows the G alpha subunits to bind G beta/gamma subunit heterodimers, forming inactive G-protein heterotrimers, thereby terminating the signal. Alternate transcriptional splice variants of this gene have been observed but have not been thoroughly characterized.

Clinical significance 

Several RGS18 alleles that result in reduced RGS18 expression are associated with the development of atherosclerosis. Two single nucleotide polymorphisms in the RGS18 gene that interfere with binding of GATA1 and NFE2 transcription factors result in decreased expression of RGS18. RSG18 Knockout mice display an exaggerated platelet reactivity which in turn increases risk of developing atherosclerosis. A minor allele of RSG18 is associated with the appearance of thrombotic phenomena in a cohort of European-American and African-American patients.

Interactions 

RGS18 has been shown to interact with GNAI3.

References

Further reading